Ken Hutchinson may refer to:

People
Ken Hutchinson (actor) in The World Cup: A Captain's Tale
Kenny Hutchinson, American basketball player

Fictional characters
Ken Hutchinson, character in Starsky & Hutch
Ken Hutchinson, character in Revolution (TV series)

See also
Ken Hutchison, actor
Ken Hutcherson, American football player